Owen Feltham (1602 – 23 February 1668) was an English writer, author of a book entitled Resolves, Divine, Moral, and Political (c. 1620), containing 146 short essays. It had great popularity in its day. Feltham was for a time in the household of the Earl of Thomond as chaplain or sec., and published (1652), Brief Character of the Low Countries.  His most cited essay is "How the Distempers of these Times should affect wise Men" which was selected for inclusion in John Gross' The Oxford Book of Essays, a compilation of over a hundred of the finest essays in the English language.

Resolves, Divine, Moral and Political
Feltham was still a teenager when he published his first edition of Resolves in 1623.  This collection of essays played a crucial role in the development of the English essay as a genre.

The original edition included 100 “resolves” that were considered to be “short, aphoristic commentaries on aspects of the three realms delineated by the title: divine, ethical, and political…[and] they concern[ed] in equal measure the private and public realms of middle-class English life.” Later revisions reflect how Feltham attempted to amalgamate these three distinct dimensions of “middle-class English life”—divine, ethical and political—into a more cohesive context.  Or, in other words, the revisions reflect “ ‘the expansion of aphorisms into statements that approach conversation’…[which] corresponds to a more tolerant humanism.” This tolerance is perhaps best demonstrated in regards to the ubiquitous Woman Question, a debate which continued to play a large role in the social atmosphere of Renaissance Britain.  Both men and women joined in the debate, and though most men viewed the fairer sex in rigid terms—as either “unconstant”  or “excellent”—there were many men like Feltham who preferred to “[accept] some assumptions about gender but [question] many others: he asks commonsense questions and is willing to look beyond stereotypes.”  In his 1661 edition of Resolves, Feltham’s 85th resolve, entitled "Of Marriage and Single Life," he writes: "A wise wife comprehends both sexes: she is a woman for her body, and she is a man within: for her soul is like her Husbands.... It is a Crown of blessings, when in one woman a man findeth both a wife and a friend."  In his 1628 edition, which includes the resolve entitled “Of Woman,” Feltham observes the social disparities of his time in regards to gender equality. Though he does not offer any solutions, his commentary could be considered a type of proto-feminist or proto-egalitarianist philosophy: “Whence proceed the most abhorred villainies, but from a masculine unblushing impudence? When a woman grows bold and daring, we dislike her, and say, ‘she is too like a man’: yet in our selves, we magnify what we condemn. Is not this injustice?”

Sources
BookRags

The Broadview Anthology of British Literature. Ed. Joseph Black et al.New York: Broadview  Press, 2007.

External links

 'Resolves, Divine, Moral, and Political'' 1904 edition
Resolves, Divine, Moral, and Political (c. 1620) 1820 edition
Essays by Owen Feltham at Quotidiana.org
 

English essayists
1602 births
1668 deaths